Álvaro Marcelo García Zaroba (born January 13, 1984 in Rocha), known as Álvaro García, is a Uruguayan footballer who plays for Deportivo Achuapa in Guatemala.

References

External links
 
 

Living people
1984 births
Uruguayan footballers
Uruguayan expatriate footballers
Association football goalkeepers
Rocha F.C. players
Club Atlético River Plate (Montevideo) players
Tacuarembó F.C. players
Atenas de San Carlos players
Cerro Largo F.C. players
Club Tacuary footballers
El Tanque Sisley players
C.D. Guastatoya players
Cobán Imperial players
Xelajú MC players
Plaza Colonia players
Deportivo Zacapa players
Deportivo Achuapa players
Expatriate footballers in Paraguay
Expatriate footballers in Guatemala
Uruguayan expatriate sportspeople in Paraguay
Uruguayan expatriate sportspeople in Guatemala